Protein boule-like is a protein that in humans is encoded by the BOLL gene.

Function 

This gene belongs to the DAZ gene family required for germ cell development. It encodes an RNA-binding protein which is more similar to Drosophila Boule than to human proteins encoded by genes DAZ (deleted in azoospermia) or DAZL (deleted in azoospermia-like). Loss of this gene function results in the absence of sperm in semen (azoospermia). Histological studies demonstrated that the primary defect is at the meiotic G2 / M transition in fruitfly but in mice the primary defect is postmeiotic at round spermatid stage. Multiple alternatively spliced transcript variants encoding distinct isoforms have been found for this gene.

The boule-like protein appears to be ubiquitously expressed in males of all animal species, except in the most primitive trichoplax.

References

Further reading

External links